Lighting Matches is the debut studio album by British singer-songwriter Tom Grennan, released on 6 July 2018 through Insanity Records. The album spawned five singles, and includes three singles, released on Grennan's previously three EPs.

Critical reception 

Lighting Matches was generally well received by critics. NME critic Andrew Trendell said that the album "makes Bedford sound like Hollywood" and that Grennan "knows what he's doing". However, Clash critic Nick Roseblade said that the album "isn't a bad album, but sadly it doesn't excel either" and that "it all feels a little too rehearsed and sanitised in its delivery."

Track listing

Chart performance

Certifications

References

2018 debut albums
Tom Grennan albums